The 2010 Tour de Langkawi was the 15th edition of the Tour de Langkawi, a cycling stage race that takes place in Malaysia. It began on 1 March in Kota Bharu and ended on 7 March in Merdeka Square, Kuala Lumpur. The race comprises 7 stages, covering 1013.9 kilometres.

Stage 1
1 March 2010 — Kota Bharu to Kuala Berang,

Stage 2
2 March 2010 — Kuala Terengganu to Chukai,

Stage 3
3 March 2010 — Pekan to Mersing,

Stage 4
4 March 2010 — Mersing to Parit Sulong,

Stage 5
5 March 2010 — Muar to Port Dickson,

Stage 6
6 March 2010 — Putrajaya to Genting Highlands,

Stage 7
7 March 2010 — Kuala Kubu Bharu to Dataran Merdeka,

References

External links
 

Tour de Langkawi
Tour de Langkawi